Leslie J. Winner is a North Carolina attorney and former executive director of the Winston-Salem-based Z. Smith Reynolds Foundation. At the time of her selection to succeed Thomas W. Ross at the foundation, Winner was general counsel and vice president for the University of North Carolina system.

Thornburg v. Gingles

Interested in securing voting rights for African Americans, Winner represented the respondent Gingles in Thornburg v. Gingles (1986), a Supreme Court case in which the court unanimously ruled that the state of North Carolina illegally weakened the voting power of African-Americans in Mecklenburg and five other legislative districts.

Z. Smith Reynolds Foundation

In February 2013, Winner said that she was "surprised and disappointed" by a politically charged memo distributed by Blueprint North Carolina, a Reynolds Foundation grantee and 501(c)(3) tax-exempt organization."(Z. Smith Reynolds) believes in robust debate on issues of public importance, (it) does not support attacking people," Winner said. "We were disappointed to learn that Blueprint is advocating this strategy…We are taking this seriously. We are determining our options and our obligations. We will get to the bottom of it."

The memo in question recommended "crippling" Republican leaders in the N.C. governor's office and legislature. It also suggested that GOP leaders be "eviscerated" and that Republican Gov. Pat McCrory be slammed "when he contradicts his promises."

Early life and education
Winner was born in Asheville, NC, on October 24, 1950.  She received the A.B. degree from Brown University and the J.D. degree from Northeastern University School of Law.  She served six years (three terms) in the North Carolina Senate, representing part of Mecklenburg County as a Democrat.

Awards and honours

Winner has also been awarded the Order of the Long Leaf Pine. It is, according to the Order of the Long Leaf Pine, "Among the most sought after and valued awards conferred by the Governor of North Carolina is The Order of the Long Leaf Pine, which is presented to outstanding North Carolinian's who have a proven record of service to the State. Persons who have demonstrated a lifetime of service to the State may qualify."

Winner is currently on the boards of The Well of Mercy, the Jewish Heritage Society, and Made in Durham. In the past, she has served on the Board of Trustees for UNC Asheville and the UNC Charlotte Foundation.

References

External links

ZSR Staff
Winston-Salem Journal: UNC lawyer, an advocate for poor, to lead foundation
UNC Press Release
Leslie Winner Papers: J. Murrey Atkins Library, UNC Charlotte

North Carolina state senators
Living people
1950 births
North Carolina lawyers
Brown University alumni
Northwestern University alumni
Women state legislators in North Carolina
Wasserstein Fellows
21st-century American women